Two submarines of the French Navy have borne the name Artémis in honour of the goddess Artemis:

 , an  launched in 1914 and struck in 1927.
 , an  launched in 1942 and struck in 1967.

See also
 
 
 

French Navy ship names